The Araba were an indigenous Australian people of Queensland.

Country

Alternative names
 A:rap
 Aripa
 Ngariba. (Walangama exonym)

Notes

Citations

Sources

Aboriginal peoples of Queensland